Marvel Action Universe was a 1988–1991 weekly syndicated television block from Marvel Productions featuring animated adaptions of Dino-Riders and RoboCop, along with reruns of the 1981 Spider-Man cartoon and Spider-Man and His Amazing Friends.

Format 
The first half of the hour was an episode of Dino-Riders; the second half an episode of RoboCop. Reruns of the 1981 Spider-Man cartoon (alternating with Spider-Man and His Amazing Friends) were aired, making the program 90 minutes long in some markets. The block is notable for debuting the X-Men pilot, X-Men: Pryde of the X-Men during its second season. Various other Marvel cartoons began airing during the show's second season as well.

To coincide the airings of various shows on the program, Marvel produced a few comics based on some of the shows. In 1989, a Dino-Riders comic series was published by Marvel. Also in 1989, Marvel reprinted the original one-shot comic Spider-Man and His Amazing Friends, first published in 1981, retitled as Marvel Action Universe #1. In 1990, Marvel published another one-shot comic titled X-Men Animation Special, an adaptation of Pryde of the X-Men that featured cell animation from the cartoon rather than original art. Beginning in 1990, Marvel published a RoboCop comic adaption, which lasted two years.

Series overview

First-run series

Dino-Riders 

Dino-Riders was introduced primarily as a promotion to launch a new Tyco toy line. The series told the story of the Valorians, a peaceful race of telepathic humans whose home planet was conquered by the Rulon Empire. 400 survivors escaped on a space ship and time traveled to prehistoric Earth using the experimental Space-Time Energy Projector (also known as the S.T.E.P). But Emperor Krulos and his lead commanders accidentally followed them into the past when a tractor beam locked onto the Valorians' ship during the time jump. Stranded in the past, the two groups recruited the planet's dinosaur population into their struggle. The Valorians used their telepathy for taming dinosaurs to ride and for domestic use. The Rulons captured dinosaurs with 'brain boxes'. These were large metal helmets which fit onto dinosaur's heads and control their brains. Both Valorians and Rulons would often fit dinosaurs with huge arrays of laser and weapon platforms, upon which people could ride, and attack one another. Battles were mostly motivated by the Rulon's desire to steal the S.T.E.P. from the Valorians, and almost always inconclusive, seldom accomplishing more for either side than restoring the status quo from the beginning of the episode.

Pryde of the X-Men 

Pryde of the X-Men is an unsold animated television pilot from 1989 starring the X-Men. The title is a pun based on the name of X-Men member Kitty Pryde, with the episode told, mostly, from her point of view. The pilot aired infrequently, often in the time slot held by RoboCop.

RoboCop 

The animated version of RoboCop is based on the character and events of the movie of the same name. The series is a continuation from the movie, with Alex Murphy (RoboCop) still fighting to save the city of Old Detroit from assorted rogue elements, and on occasion, fighting to reclaim aspects of his humanity and maintain his usefulness in the eyes of the "Old Man", president of Omni Consumer Products (OCP). Many episodes see RoboCop's reputation put to the test or soured by interventions from Dr. McNamara, the creator of ED-260, the upgradable version of the Enforcement Droid Series 209 and the top competitor for the financial backing of OCP. McNamara often develops other mechanical menaces that frequently threaten RoboCop. On the home front, RoboCop is befriended as always by Officer Anne Lewis, but is also picked on and lambasted by the prejudiced Lieutenant Hedgecock, ever determined to be rid of him.

Rebroadcasts

Defenders of the Earth 

The animated television series from 1986, featuring characters from three comic strips distributed by King Features Syndicate—Flash Gordon, the Phantom, and Mandrake the Magician—battling the Flash Gordon villain Ming the Merciless in the year 2015. Supporting characters include their children Rick Gordon, Jedda Walker (daughter of the Phantom), Kshin (adopted son of Mandrake), Mandrake's assistant Lothar, and Lothar's son L.J. The show lasted for 65 episodes; there was also a short-lived comic book series published by Star Comics (an imprint of Marvel Comics). The closing credits credit Rob Walsh and Tony Pastor for the main title music, and Stan Lee for the lyrics.

The plot begins with Flash Gordon and his son Rick escaping from Ming the Merciless. Ming has exhausted all the natural resources of his home planet Mongo and has set his sights on Earth. Flash's wife Dale Arden is captured and Ming tries to brainwash her. She resists to the point of death.

Dungeons & Dragons 

The 1983 animated television series based on TSR's Dungeons & Dragons role-playing game. A co-production of Marvel Productions and TSR. The show's story editors were Hank Saroyan (who voice directed the series) and Steve Gerber, both of whom contributed episodes and had a firm hand in the writing of the series. The level of violence was controversial for American children's television at the time, and the script of one episode, "The Dragon's Graveyard", was almost shelved because the characters contemplated killing their nemesis, Venger. In 1985, the National Coalition on Television Violence demanded that the FTC run a warning during each broadcast stating that Dungeons & Dragons had been linked to real life violent deaths. The series spawned more than 100 different licenses, and the show led its time slot for two years.

The general premise of the show is that a group of children are pulled into the "Realm of Dungeons & Dragons" by taking a magical dark ride on an amusement park roller coaster. Invariably, the children try to return home, but often take detours to help people, or find that their fates are intertwined with the fate of others.

Upon arriving in the Realm, the children are a little out of place, but the Dungeon Master, named for the referee in the role-playing game, assuming the role of their mentor, appears and gives them each a class and a magical item to suit that class.

The Incredible Hulk 

The 1982 animated series based on the Marvel Comics character of the same name. The series was based upon the Hulk comic in regards to the origin story (albeit with supposedly alien involvement rather than Soviet spies), as well as featuring characters from the comics including Rick Jones (who would often refer to Bruce as "Doc"), Major Ned Talbot, who was essentially the same character as Glenn Talbot (although perhaps a little less intelligent and more clumsy than his comic book counterpart and as a result of this is referred to by his men as Noodlehead Ned), Betty Ross, and General Ross, along with the first cartoon appearance of the She-Hulk. Yet only one classic Hulk villain appeared in a single episode of the series, The Leader, with a number of villains normally associated with other Marvel characters and newly created foes filling out the other episodes.

Also introduced were the Hispanic family of Rio and his daughter Rita, the father and his efforts to advertise his restaurant (Rio's Rancheros) providing more chances for comic relief and Rita providing a love interest for Rick Jones.

The New Fantastic Four 

The 1978 animated series based on Marvel's comic book series Fantastic Four. The series replaced the character of the Human Torch with a robot named H.E.R.B.I.E., (Humanoid Experimental Robot, B-type, Integrated Electronics). A long-lasting rumor stated that this change was made by the TV network (NBC) because executives did not want young viewers to imitate the Human Torch by setting themselves on fire. This rumor proved to be untrue, as the 1978 television rights to use that character were tied up by a proposed television pilot movie in development by Universal Studios (now a sister company to NBC) that ended up never being produced.

Spider-Man/Spider-Man and His Amazing Friends 

The 1981 syndicated version of Spider-Man was based on the popular Marvel Comics character of the same name. The series featured Peter Parker having to balance his alter ego crimefighting with his responsibilities as a university student, a part-time photographer for the Daily Bugle and caring for his elderly Aunt May. Spider-Man and His Amazing Friends, which originally aired on NBC around the same time, featured Spider-Man, Iceman, and Firestar. In this incarnation, the three superheroes are all college students at Empire State University, who operate as the "Spider-Friends" as the superheroes battle various supervillains.

Spider-Woman 

The 1979 animated television series, based on the Marvel Comics character Spider-Woman. According to the title sequence, Jessica Drew (voiced by Joan Van Ark) was bitten by a poisonous spider as a child; her father saved her life by injecting her with an experimental "spider serum," which also granted her superhuman powers.  As an adult, Jessica is editor of Justice Magazine, with two other employees featured; photographer Jeff and Jessica's teenage nephew Billy. When trouble arises, Jessica slips away to change into her secret identity of Spider-Woman.

The animated Spider-Woman's powers are noticeably modified; her enhanced strength in particular seems entirely missing, as she is shown in several episodes being restrained by means (such as ordinary rope) that her super-strong comic-book counterpart could easily break.  In addition to the ability to cling to walls, the animated Spider-Woman also has the ability to change into costume merely by spinning around.

Stations

The Marvel Action Hour 

During the second season of The Marvel Action Hour from 1995 to 1996, the series was given the revived Marvel Action Universe banner.

References

External links 
 Marvel Action Universe on RetroJunk
 Marvel Action Universe title (1988)
 

 
Television programming blocks
Animated television series based on Marvel Comics
1988 American television series debuts
1991 American television series endings
First-run syndicated television programs in the United States
1980s American animated television series
1990s American animated television series
Television syndication packages